Shivendra Mahal (born in 1957 in Ropar) is an Indian actor, anchor and movie director. He began his career with serials like his dual role portrayal of Parshurama and Shiva in the mega-epic Mahabharata (1988). He has done many serials in Hindi as well as in his mother language Punjabi. He has directed the film Panchhtawa in 1996. He acted in more than 30 Punjabi & Hindi films. His famous Punjabi language films include Baaghi Soormey (1993), Putt Sardaran De, Vidroh, Main Maa Punjab Dee (National Award winner film Directed by Balwant Dullat), etc.

Filmography
Baghi Soormey (1993) .... Sucha Singh
Putt Sardaran De (1993)
Deson Pardes (1998)
Main Maa Punjab Dee (1998) (Written and Directed by Balwant Dullat )
Ishq Nachave Gali Gali (2001) (Directed by Balwant Dullat )
Vidroh (2006)
Rustam-e-Hind (2006)
Jag Jeondyan De Mele (2009)
Dharti (2011)
Mel Karade Rabba (2011)
Jihne Mera Dil Lutya (2011)
Yaar Anmulle (2011)
Yaaran Naal Bahaaran 2 (2012)
Welcome To Punjab
Punjab Bolda Hai
Tu Mera Bhai Main Tera Bhai
Saadi Vakhri E Shann
Mallu Singh (Malayalam Film) (2012)
Rangeeley (2013)
Love Yoou Soniye (2013)
Yaaran Naal Baharaan 2
Fir Mammla Gadbar Gadbar
Gaddaar:The Traitor
Hero Naam Yaad Rakhi
Shagna Di Tyari (Music Video)
Ambarsariya (2016)
Teshan  (2016)
Jawaani Jaaneman (2020)

References

Male actors in Punjabi cinema
Male actors in Hindi cinema
Living people
21st-century Indian male actors
20th-century Indian male actors
Male actors from Punjab, India
1957 births